The Eigensystem realization algorithm (ERA) is a system identification technique popular in civil engineering, in particular in structural health monitoring.  ERA can be used as a modal analysis technique and generates a system realization using the time domain response (multi-)input and (multi-)output data.  The ERA was proposed by Juang and Pappa  and has been used for system identification of aerospace structures such as the Galileo spacecraft, turbines, civil structures  and many other type of systems.

Uses in structural engineering

In structural engineering the ERA is used to identify natural frequencies, mode shapes and damping ratios.  The ERA is commonly used in conjunction with the Natural Excitation Technique (NExT) to identify modal parameters from ambient vibration.  The technique has been applied to buildings, bridges, and many other type of structural systems.  In the area of structural health monitoring the ERA and other modal identification techniques play an important role in developing a model of the structure from experimental data.  The state space representation, or the modal parameters are used for further analysis and identify possible damage in structures.

Algorithm
It is recommended to review the concepts of State-space representation and vibration before studying the ERA.  Given pulse response data form the Hankel matrix
 
where  is the  pulse response at time step . Then choose only the rows and columns corresponding to physical modes to form the matrices . Then the discrete time system realization can be given by:
 
 
 

Example 

Consider a single degree of freedom (SDOF) system with stiffness , mass , and damping .  The equation of motion for this SDOF is

The continuous state-space representation of this system is

where  represent the states of the system corresponding to the displacement  and velocity  of the SDOF. However, here  is used for the SDOF displacement.

See also 
 Frequency domain decomposition
 Stochastic subspace identification
 ERA/DC

References

Systems theory